Lee Jung-sik (born July 6, 1995) is a South Korean actor and model. He is best known for his starring roles in the web series I Have Three Boyfriends (2019) and Summer Guys (2021).

Biography and career
He was born on July 6, 1995. After completing his studies from Myongji University, he signed with agency Namoo Actors in 2016. He made his debut in 2016 appearing in My Little Princess song Because Of You which made him noted by the audience. He did modeling for magazines and comerciales for Kakao Bank, Cosmetic Smoothie and Clothing Brand XESS it gained him more attention. In 2019 he made his debut as actor by starring in four dramas and appearing in DeAid's Changed song. He appeared on Farming Academy by playing a supporting role and in the same year he starred in drama I Have Three Boyfriends which was his first lead role which gained him a lot of more attention. He reprise his role of Lee Hae-seung of Farming Academy 2 in 2019. He starred in drama Love with Flaws by playing a supporting of a University student which attracted him attention from the audience.

Filmography

Television

Web series

Music video

References

External links
 

1995 births
Living people
People from Samcheok
South Korean male models
South Korean male television actors
South Korean male web series actors
21st-century South Korean male actors